Bogan Pride is an Australian comedy television series which first screened on SBS TV in 2008. The six-part series created by and starring actress, Rebel Wilson. The series centres on the life of a teenage bogan girl.

Synopsis
Jennie Cragg (Rebel Wilson) is an obese girl who lives in Boonelg with her extremely overweight mother Berenice, who is now confined to her living-room chair. Her Aunty Cassandra’s gay husband has left her. Nick is the extremely good-looking neighbour, and Jennie's best friends are hypochondriac Nigella and the extremely religious Amy Lee. Jennie enters a dance competition to pay for her mum’s stomach stapling operation, attempts to impress the boy she has a crush on and get revenge on the school skanks.

Cast
 Rebel Wilson as Jennie Cragg
 Sally Anne Upton as Berenice Cragg
 Lulu McClatchy as Aunt Cassandra
 Fanny Hanusin as Amy Lee
 Alice Ansara as Nigella
 Ryan Jones as Nick
 Natasha Cunningham as Tracy 
 Kate Jenkinson as Tizzneen  
 Janine Atwill as Tessa  
 Caroline Lee as Erin 
 Wilhelmina Stracke as Gaylene
 Tim Stitz as Jimmy 
 Darren Amor as Stevie 
 Audra Hopgood as Marilyn 
 Leanne Courtney as Susan  
 Brian Mannix as Burt Cragg
 Adam Zwar as Mr Laffer

Production
In 2008 Wilson created and wrote the musical comedy series Bogan Pride which was picked up for six episodes by SBS One.
.

Most of the furniture/house items and clothing were bought from charity shops. And food is bought from Aldi.

Each episode was written by Wilson, directed by Peter Templeman and produced by Tony Ayres and Michael McMahon (Home Song Stories, Walking on Water).

The show was not renewed for a second season.

See also
 List of Australian television series

References

External links
 https://web.archive.org/web/20080821085200/http://www.fatmandi.com/blogs/news Fat Mandi · Rebel Wison website
 

Australian comedy television series
Special Broadcasting Service original programming
2008 Australian television series debuts
2008 Australian television series endings
English-language television shows
Mass media portrayals of the working class
Television series created by Rebel Wilson
Working class in Australia